The Fifth Book of the Maccabees is an ancient Jewish work relating the history in the 2nd and 1st centuries BC.

Content

The book chronicles the events from Heliodorus' attempt to rob the Temple treasury in 186 BC to the death of Herod the Great's two sons about 6 BC.

Similar to other Books of the Maccabees, this work aims at consoling Jews in their sufferings and encouraging them to be steadfast "in their devotion to the Mosaic law".

Textual history

The book survives in Arabic, but was probably composed in Hebrew, judging from numerous Hebraisms. As no trace of a Hebrew text exists, some scholars (e.g. Zunz, Heinrich Graetz and Samuel Davidson) consider the work to have been in Arabic from Hebrew memoirs.  

The author probably was a Jew living some time after the destruction of the temple in 70 AD. 

The book bears some relationship to the history of Josippon.

The book is considered canon by the Syriac Orthodox Church.

Controversy 
Some believe that the work is little more than a summary of the events in the first four Books of Maccabees and the relevant chapters in Flavius Josephus. Only chapter 12 is original but also "teems with errors of various kinds". Others hold this to be extremely unlikely, and believe it may have relied upon Jason of Cyrene, Justus of Tiberias, and/or Nicolaus of Damascus.

There is much debate on the relation of this book to Josippon. Many scholars on Josippon believe it is nothing more than an epitome of it. Some scholars think that this is impossible, due to the conclusion that 5 Maccabees predates Josippon, believing it to be the other way around, with Jossippon summarizing multiple works, including 5 Maccabees.

Title

The designation 5 Maccabees was introduced in 1832 by Henry Cotton and perpetuated by Samuel Davidson and others. Alternative titles include Arabic 2 Maccabees and Arabic Maccabees. The name is also used to denote a text contained in the Translatio Syra Peshitto, edited by Ceriani, which however is nothing more than a Syriac version of the 6th book of Josephus' Jewish War.

References

5
Lost Jewish texts

External links 

 https://web.archive.org/web/20140810152435/http://www.nieuw-apostolisch-bijbelverbond.org/5-maccabees